The Arlington Pumping Station, built in 1907, is a historic water pumping station on Brattle Court (off Brattle Street) in Arlington, Massachusetts. Its purpose was to provide water to Lexington and higher elevations in Arlington.  The station was put in service on December 4, 1907.

Design
The station was designed by CA Dodge & Co, with construction beginning August 23, 1906. The foundation walls are of Portland cement concrete, faced, where exposed on the outside below the water-table course, with seam-faced granite. Exterior walls are of dark-red faced brick, with Longmeadow brownstone trimmings, and are surmounted by a hip roof supported by steel trusses and covered with slate. The steps at the main entrance, the water-table course and the trimmings below the water-table are of pink Milford granite.

The interior facing of the engine and boiler room walls is of red brick. The engine room floor is of red quarry tile. The floors in the basement of the engine room and in the boiler and coal houses are granolithic. In this roof there are 16 openings through which coal may be unloaded from the cars. The brick chimney is in the rear of the building. The flue is 2 feet 6 inches in diameter. The main entrance is on the front of the building.

Pumping equipment
The Allis-Chalmers Company furnished the pumping equipment, which was a horizontal, cross-compound, flywheel engine fitted with Corliss valve gear, and operating two horizontal, outside packed, plunger pumps. The high and low pressure steam pistons were 14 inches and 28 inches in diameter, respectively, and the pump plungers 8% inches in diameter, all having a stroke of 18 inches. The capacity of the engine at 65 revolutions per minute was 1,500,000 gallons in twenty-four hours. The engine which was erected by the Blake & Knowles Steam Pump Works was of the horizontal, cross-compound, direct-acting type, operating two outside packed, plunger pumps. The steam cylinders were 11 inches and 22 inches in diameter, the pump plungers 12 inches in diameter, and both pistons and plungers have a stroke of 18 inches. When operated at the rate of 31 revolutions per minute the capacity was 1,500,000 gallons per day.

See also
Mystic Water Works, a pumping station in Somerville
National Register of Historic Places listings in Arlington, Massachusetts

References

 Massachusetts Metropolitan Water and Sewerage Board, Seventh Annual Report of the Metropolitan Water and Sewerage Board, For the Year 1907, Volume 2, Boston, 1908, pages 97–99.

Buildings and structures in Arlington, Massachusetts
Industrial buildings and structures on the National Register of Historic Places in Massachusetts
Water supply pumping stations on the National Register of Historic Places
Water supply infrastructure in Massachusetts
Infrastructure completed in 1907
National Register of Historic Places in Arlington, Massachusetts